Graham William Walker (4 August 1896 – 7 September 1962) was an English motorcycle racer, broadcaster and journalist. He also contributed greatly to the motorcycle section of the National Motor Museum.

Graham Walker was born in Wallington, Surrey and was the son of William Walker (1851–?), a shipping company clerk, and Jessie née Goodman (1859–?), he had two sisters and two brothers one of whom was Eric Anderson Walker. He was educated at Highgate School from 1910 to 1912 and had five siblings - three brothers and two sisters. Walker married Elsie Norah Fyfield née Spratt (1897–1999) and together they had one son, Graeme Murray Walker, who went on to have a long career as a motorsport commentator.

Walker was a motorcycle despatch rider in the First World War for the Royal Engineers Signal Service, where he received a leg injury requiring him to ride a motorcycle with a modified brake pedal. Despite this he had a successful racing career with Rudge, Sunbeam and Norton. Riding a 493cc Sunbeam he was a member of the victorious British International Trophy Team at the ISDT held in Buxton 1926 and Ambleside 1927 then saw success on the Silver Vase team in 1928 at Harrogate and 1932 Merano in Italy. Road successes included winning the Ulster Grand Prix on a Rudge Ulster in 1928, the first road race win with an average of 80 mph. Walker also won the 350cc class at the 1931 North West 200, again on a Rudge. He rode many times in the Isle of Man TT, winning the lightweight (250cc) class in 1931, and became president of the TT Riders Association.

During World War II, Walker took part in a campaign to recruit new dispatch riders.

In 1935, after his motorcycle racing career had finished, Walker was employed by the BBC as a commentator for motorcycle racing events on television and radio. In 1949, Walker was partnered on the BBC's motorcycle commentaries with his son, Murray.

He was editor of Motor Cycling magazine from 1938 to 1954 and he then took up a directorship at the Montagu Motor Museum, of which his enthusiasm for preserving historic motorcycles partly led to the museum having opened a motorcycle section in 1956.

Isle of Man TT Race career

References

External links 
 Motor Cycling magazine site
 TT results and photos

English motorcycle racers
Isle of Man TT riders
Royal Engineers soldiers
People educated at Highgate School
1896 births
1962 deaths
British Army personnel of World War I